Terrell Christopher Ashley Miller (born 16 December 1994) is a footballer who plays for Redbridge as a left winger.

Born in England, he represented Montserrat at international level.

Club career
Miller has played for Peterborough United, Stevenage, Brentford, Northwood, Carshalton Athletic, Watford, Hemel Hempstead Town, Leverstock Green, Braintree Town, Maidenhead United, Kings Langley, Shoreham and Redbridge.

In July 2015 he made a five-minute substitute appearance as a triallist for Scottish club Partick Thistle, in a friendly match.

International career
He made his international debut for Montserrat in 2012, and competed in 2012 Caribbean Cup qualification.

References

1994 births
Living people
Montserratian footballers
Montserrat international footballers
English footballers
English people of Montserratian descent
Peterborough United F.C. players
Stevenage F.C. players
Brentford F.C. players
Northwood F.C. players
Carshalton Athletic F.C. players
Watford F.C. players
Hemel Hempstead Town F.C. players
Leverstock Green F.C. players
Braintree Town F.C. players
Maidenhead United F.C. players
Kings Langley F.C. players
Shoreham F.C. players
Redbridge F.C. players
National League (English football) players
Southern Football League players
Isthmian League players
Association football wingers